Mary Cecilia Grey (born 1941) is a Roman Catholic ecofeminist liberation theologian in the United Kingdom. She edited the journal Ecotheology for 10 years. She has previously been a professor teaching pastoral theology at the University of Wales, Lampeter; contemporary theology at the University of Southampton, La Sainte Union, and St Mary's University, Twickenham; and feminism and Christianity at the Catholic University of Nijmegen in the Netherlands.

Grey was born on 16 June 1941 in Houghton-le-Spring, County Durham. She completed Bachelor of Arts and Master of Arts degrees from the University of Oxford, as well as a diploma in pastoral catechetics, a Master of Arts degree in religious studies, a Bachelor of Sacred Theology degree, and a Doctor of Philosophy degree from the Catholic University of Louvain in Belgium. She is an honorary fellow of Sarum College, Salisbury, and was president of the European Society of Women in Theological Research from 1989 to 1991.

Her research has focused primarily on feminist liberation theology and spiritualities, but has also encompassed ecofeminist theology, ecological theology and spirituality, Indian liberation theology, Christian–Jewish-Palestinian reconciliation, systematic theology from a feminist perspective and the relationship between social justice and theology. Her current work focuses on reconciliation, connecting reconciliation with the earth and reconciliation among ethnic groups.

In recent years, she has given particular focus to reconciliation in Israel and Palestine. Accordingly, she is Chair of Living Stones of the Holy Land Trust, an organization working for justice and peace in the Holy Lands. Grey also serves as Chair of the Theology Group of Friends of Sabeel UK and as a trustee of the Balfour Project, which recognizes Britain's historical role in creating a situation of conflict between Israel and Palestine.

Grey has been involved in a number of other nonprofit organisations. She co-founded Wells for India, a water-based organisation in Rajasthan, India with Nicholas Grey and they currently serve as co-presidents
Grey also serves as patron of both the Dalit Solidarity Network UK and the Centre for Theology and Health, Holy Rood House, Thirsk, UK.

Works

Thesis

Books

Articles

References

External links
 Profile from Gresham College

Living people
Academics of the University of Wales, Lampeter
British theologians
Ecotheology
Ecofeminists
Feminist studies scholars
1941 births
KU Leuven alumni
Alumni of the University of Oxford
People associated with Sarum College
20th-century British theologians
21st-century British theologians
Liberation theologians
Christian feminist theologians
British Roman Catholics